Mark Alexander Wallace (born 19 November 1981) is a former Welsh cricketer; a left-handed batsman and wicket-keeper.

Wallace made his second XI debut for Glamorgan at the age of just 15, and by 1998 he was in the England U-19 team that played Pakistan, as well as accompanying them to New Zealand the following winter and playing three one-day games against Australia U-19s in the summer of 1999, a year in which he won the NBC Denis Compton Award.

In September 1999, he made his bow in first-class cricket, appearing in the County Championship game against Somerset at the age of 17 years and 287 days – thus making him Glamorgan's youngest ever Championship wicket-keeper. Wallace took five catches in the match, and scored 28 from number nine in the first innings, and this was enough for him to keep his county place for the rest of the season. In an innings victory over Yorkshire, he made his first half-century: 64 not out, again batting at number nine.

After appearing in the U-19 World Cup in the winter, Wallace played no first-team county cricket for the first half of the season, concentrating on his A-Levels, but in August was appointed captain of the U-19s for a one-day series against Sri Lanka, though was unable to take up his appointment because of an injury to his hand. He did, however, recover in time to replace the (also injured) Adrian Shaw for Glamorgan near the end of the season.

After another U-19 tour, this time to India, Wallace established himself during the 2001 season as his county's first-choice wicket-keeper, and was selected to visit Australia with the ECB National Academy squad, an honour he repeated the following winter. 2002 saw him make his maiden first-class century when he hit an unbeaten 106 in Glamorgan's pipe-opener against Derbyshire, albeit in a losing cause. Wallace finished 2002 with 61 dismissals in first-class and 27 in List A games, the latter helping his side to the Norwich Union League title.

The 2003 summer brought Wallace both his county cap and his greatest success with the bat, as he hit 856 first-class runs at 29.51 including 117 against Durham in August and 121 against the same opponents a month later; on the second occasion, Wallace opened the batting.

Wallace continued to be Glamorgan's first choice wicket-keeper in all forms of the game and captained the county for the first time against Somerset at Taunton on 30 August 2007. In 2008 Wallace was named the club's one-day player of the year and supporters player of the year with his most memorable performance being a match winning score of 48 off just 17 balls against Leicestershire in the Pro40 competition at Colwyn Bay.

In 2011 Wallace became the first Glamorgan wicket-keeper to ever score a thousand first-class runs in a season surpassing Jimmy Stone's record aggregate set in 1923 along the way.

Wallace is considered as Glamorgan's finest ever wicket-keeper/batsman. He holds the record for the most first-class centuries by a Glamorgan wicket-keeper (15) with his highest score of 139 coming in the final game of the 2009 season against Surrey at the Oval. Wallace has 2 List A centuries coming in the 2012 and 2013 seasons. Having previously held the position of vice-captain he was appointed Glamorgan captain for the 2012 season. Having previously served as a players representative Wallace was elected as Chairman of the Professional Cricketers Association in 2013.

He graduated from Staffordshire University with a degree in Professional Sports Writing and Broadcasting in the summer of 2008 and studied for a master's degree at UWIC. He has written regularly on cricket and rugby in the Welsh press.

Career best performances
as of 9 November 2012

References

External links
 
 Mark Wallace appointed as Glamorgan's Director of Cricket

1981 births
Living people
Alumni of Staffordshire University
Cricketers from Abergavenny
Directors of Cricket
Glamorgan cricketers
NBC Denis Compton Award recipients
Wales National County cricketers
Welsh cricketers
Wicket-keepers